Rahul Chandrakant Thakkar is an Indian-American software inventor who was one of the 33 recipients of Academy Award for scientific and technical achievement in 2016. Thakkar won the Academy Award for creating the "groundbreaking design" of DreamWorks Animation Media Review System, a scalable digital film review platform.

Thakkar was also a key member of the animation software development team for Shrek, which went on to win the first-ever Academy Award for Best Animated Feature at the 74th Academy Awards. He currently resides in Virginia, working in the aerospace industry for a Boeing subsidiary.

Early life and family
Thakkar was born to Prabha Thakkar and Chandrakant Thakkar in the United Kingdom and was subsequently raised in India. Thakkar's mother Prabha, whom he considered his inspiration, was a teacher and encouraged his interest in science. His father Chandrakant was, as per Thakkar, an "actor, writer and director" apart from being a voice-over artist.

Thakkar spent his early years in Mumbai and considers himself a Mumbaikar. He completed his graduation from the University of Mumbai with a degree in computer science. Eventually, Thakkar studied at Utah State University to complete his Master's in computer science in 1995.

Because of his father's background, Thakkar's early years in India were spent around actors. During these initial years, Thakkar worked with his father for some time in Mumbai, contributing to a 1971 Films Division of India documentary, and playing parts in television and radio shows. Thakkar also worked as a voice-over artist for television advertisements. At the same time, Thakkar's interest in mathematics and science remained predominant. Later on, he moved to the United States as he believed it was easier to make visual effects movies in Hollywood. Currently, Thakkar stays with his wife and a daughter in Virginia.

Career
In the United States, after graduating, Thakkar got a job offer from an animation studio and worked for a few television advertisements, developing their visual effects. Thakkar also developed the show opening software for CBS' 1994 and 1996 election coverage, and for the Late Show with David Letterman.

He was soon invited by Pacific Data Images and he joined in 1996, to develop an animated film that turned out to be Antz. PDI was soon acquired by DreamWorks in 2000, where he headed the ' "high performance particle system rendering software" and "colour management system and software" teams. While at DreamWorks, Thakkar worked with his mentor Richard Chuang (the co-founder of Pacific Data Images) on designing the DreamWorks Animation Media Review System, which subsequently led Thakkar to jointly win the Academy Award in 2016. He was the primary coder for the system's product suite since his time at PDI, when it was yet to be known as DreamWorks Animation Media Review System.

The suite was developed in an era of 56K modems to enable seamless collaboration between different artists and technicians in film-making. In Thakkur's words:- "They wanted any artist to view to view any number of shots, back-to-back, from part of the film, in high resolution, at 24 fps, with high quality audio, with speed-change control, from any phase of production from any department (story, editing, animation, modeling, layout, lighting, vfx, etc.)..."

At PDI and DreamWorks, Thakkar worked on several films, including Forces of Nature, Antz, The Legend of Bagger Vance, The Peacemaker and A Simple Wish. He was also a member of the animation software development team for Shrek, which went on to win the first-ever Academy Award for Best Animated Feature at the 74th Academy Awards.

After leaving DreamWorks in 2002, Thakkar worked in PIXIA Corp from 2003 to 2013 as a Chief Architect and was the Vice President of Technology in the area of satellite imagery. He then worked at Madison Square Garden from 2013 to 2014 as Vice President of Technology contributing in the entertainment, media and sports fields. Later, in 2014, he became the Vice President of R&D at Brivio Systems, a company operating in the access control industry. Thakkar noted certain surveillance drones used in the rescue of Captain Philips (from Somalian pirates) ran on their software. He left Brivio in 2015, and since then has been engaged with the aerospace industry, working for a Boeing subsidiary in the cloud-computing sector.

At the time of winning the 2016 Academy Award, Thakkar had 25 patents in his name, including patents pending, and had also developed a web standard.

2016 Academy Award
Thakkar won the 2016 Academy Award for scientific and technical achievement for his "groundbreaking design" of DreamWorks Animation Media Review System. He was interviewed by six members of the Academy during the shortlisting process. In a ceremony held on 13 February 2016 at Beverly Wilshire Hotel in Beverly Hills, California, Thakkar received the Academy Award jointly with Pacific Data Images' co-founder Richard Chuang. As per the Academy, these set of awards are bestowed upon individuals who have contributed significantly over time (and not necessarily in the past year) to the motion picture industry.

Thakkar commented in a January 2016 interview to India-West, "It is quite humbling to be recognized by AMPAS (Academy of Motion Picture Arts and Sciences) with a technical achievement award... It’s a wonderful feeling to know that the work we did two decades ago was still in use by the film industry. I am honored to be sharing this award with Richard Chuang, a mentor and pioneer in visual effects." He further revealed that he was excited about attending the award ceremony, additionally commenting that he expected more Indians to be featured in the Academy Awards winners' lists in the coming years.

The award presenters noted Thakkar and Chuang's pioneer contributions in enabling stereoscopic 3D viewing for movies and especially over the film Shrek. The Academy's award citation praised the DreamWork Animation Media Review System's film review capabilities, mentioning that the technology "continues to provide artist-driven, integrated, consistent and highly scalable studio-wide playback and interactive reviews."

Notes

See also
 List of Indian winners and nominees of the Academy Awards

References

External links
 

Indian Academy Award winners
Living people
Scientists from Mumbai
Academy Award for Technical Achievement winners
University of Mumbai alumni
Utah State University alumni
Year of birth missing (living people)
Indian expatriates in the United States